"A Little Bit of You" is a song recorded by Canadian country music artist Jason McCoy. It was released in 1998 as the third single from his third studio album, Playin' for Keeps. It peaked at number 3 on the RPM Country Tracks chart in April 1998.

Chart performance

Year-end charts

References

1997 songs
1998 singles
Jason McCoy songs
Universal Music Group singles
Songs written by Craig Wiseman
Songs written by Jason McCoy